Kwasi Boateng Adjei (born August 29, 1954) is a Ghanaian politician and member of the Seventh Parliament of the Fourth Republic of Ghana representing the New Juaben North Constituency in the Eastern Region on the ticket of the New Patriotic Party (NPP). A Deputy Minister for Local Government and Rural Development from 2017 to Date.

Personal life 
Adjei is a Christian (Methodist). He is married, and has three children.

Early life and education 
Adjei was born on August 29, 1954. He hails from  Asokore – New Juaben, a town in the Eastern Region of Ghana. He entered University of Ghana and obtained his Bachelor of Science degree in business administration in 1980.

Politics 
Adjei is a member of the New Patriotic Party (NPP). In 2012, he contested for the New Juaben North seat on the ticket of the NPP sixth parliament of the fourth republic and won.

Employment 
 MCE (May 2001–January 2009)
 Managing Head at New Juaben College of Commerce, Koforidua
 Manager, administrator, HR practitioner

References

Ghanaian MPs 2017–2021
1954 births
Living people
New Patriotic Party politicians
Ghanaian MPs 2021–2025